The Woman Suffers is a 1918 Australian silent film directed by Raymond Longford. It is a melodrama starring Lottie Lyell. Two-thirds of the movie still survives.

Plot
The movie consists of eight acts.

In Echuca, a woman, Marion Masters (Connie Martyn) is unhappily married to Philip, a former war hero turned abusive drunk. She runs away from her husband with her baby son. Her husband falls on a knife and dies, their home is destroyed in a fire and she collapses in the bush. By the time she is rescued her son has been found by another family who run the station "Kooringa".

Marion is taken to a station "Willaroon" owned by widowed Stephen Manton (Charles H Francis), who has two children, Ralph and Marjory. Marion believes her son perished in the bush. She marries Manton and becomes stepmother to his children.

Her missing son grows up as Philip Stockdale (Brian Lawrence as a child, Boyd Irwin as a man), the adopted child of the owners of Kooringa Station, who already have a daughter Joan.

Twelve years later, Ralph Manton (Roland Conway) is sent to Melbourne by his father, but a flooded river forces him to take refuge at the Stockdale's station, where he seduces Joan (Evelyn Black). He goes to Melbourne and lives a playboy lifestyle, and Joan drowns herself in despair. Her brother Philip (Boyd Irwin) finds the body and vows revenge on Ralph.

He decides to seduce Ralph's sister, Marjory (Lottie Lyell) and abandons her after she becomes pregnant. She becomes mad and tries to abort her baby. Ralph discovers this and vows revenge on Philip – but is shamed when he discovers Philip's identity. Mrs Manton tells Philip the whole story and realises he is her long-lost son. Philip decides to marry Marjory.

Cast
Lottie Lyell as Marjory
Evelyn Black as Joan Stockdale
Roland Conway as Ralph Manton
Charles H Francis as Stephen Manton
Ida Gresham as Mrs Stockdale
Boyd Irwin as Philip Stockdale
Connie Martyn as Marion Masters
CR Stanford as John Stockdale
Herbert Walsh as Rev. Mr. Payne
Harry Beaumont as swagman
Guy Hastings as clergyman
Brian Lawrence as Little Phillip

Production
The movie was the first film from the Southern Cross Feature Film Company, who hired Raymond Longford to direct. It was shot in South Australia in late 1917 and early 1918.

Release
The premiere of The Woman Suffers was held at the Theatre Royal in Adelaide on 23 March 1918, and earned an excellent review in The Advertiser.

It was also in other states. However, after running for seven weeks in New South Wales, it was banned by the NSW censor on 22 October 1918. No reason was ever given despite pleas from Longford and questions put to the Chief Secretary in the Legislative Assembly.

In Adelaide, Southern Cross Features ran a competition for best opinion on the questions "Was Ralph Manton guilty of murder?" and was "Philip Masters justified?" with a prize of £2 for "the best opinion ventured."

References

External links

The Woman Suffers at National Film and Sound Archive
Surviving clips of film at YouTube
The Woman Suffers at Australian Screen Online
The Woman Suffers at Oz Movies

1918 films
Australian drama films
Australian silent feature films
Australian black-and-white films
Films directed by Raymond Longford
1918 drama films
Silent drama films